Syeda Razia Faiz (18 April 1936 – 15 November 2013) was a Bangladeshi politician. She served as a member of the National Assembly of Pakistan in the 1960s. In 1979, she was the first woman to be elected in the history of Bangladesh as a member of the Parliament of Bangladesh, alongside 299 male members (out of 300 elected members of parliament).

Early life and family
Faiz was born on 18 April 1936 into a Bengali Muslim family of Syeds from the village of Talibpur in Murshidabad. Her father, Syed Badrudduja, was a former mayor of Kolkata and a member of the Bengal Legislative Assembly and India's Lok Sabha. Through her paternal grandfather Syed Abdul Ghafur, she was a descendant of Ali, the fourth Caliph of Islam.

Meanwhile, her sister Syeda Sakina Islam, was among the 30 nominated/selected members of the reserved women seats (a quota for the winning party which holds the parliamentary majority) of the same national parliament.

Career

She was elected to Pakistan National Assembly in the 1960s, representing the country on a number of delegations overseas. During the Bangladesh Liberation War she was also part of the Pakistani delegation to the United Nations. She was placed under house arrest in Bangladesh after its independence.

In 1979, Faiz was elected from the former constituency of Abdus Sabur Khan to Bangladesh's National Parliament. She was the first female elected member of parliament in Bangladesh. In 1989, she was appointed as the minister for women and social welfare Later, she served as the vice president of Bangladesh Nationalist Party until her death.

Personal life and death
Faiz was married to Mohammad Abul Faiz, the former chairman of Petrobangla. They had a daughter, Fawzia Alam, two sons, Osman Ershad Faiz and Aman Ashraf Faiz. She died on 15 November 2013.

References

1936 births
2013 deaths
Bangladesh Nationalist Party politicians
Women members of the Jatiya Sangsad
Women government ministers of Bangladesh
20th-century Bangladeshi women politicians
8th Jatiya Sangsad members
2nd Jatiya Sangsad members
Women and Children Affairs ministers of Bangladesh
Social Welfare ministers of Bangladesh
People from Khulna District
Pakistani MNAs 1965–1969
21st-century Bangladeshi women politicians
Bangladeshi people of Indian descent
Bangladeshi people of Arab descent
West Bengal politicians
20th-century Bengalis
Bengali Muslims
People from Murshidabad district